Harry Potter (20 July 1941 – 8 May 2014) was an Australian journalist, television reporter and presenter. A veteran police and crime reporter whose career spanned more than fifty years, Potter first joined Ten Eyewitness News, a nightly news show on Network Ten, in 1978. In 2013, Harry Potter became the first recipient of the Kennedy Lifetime Achievement Award.

Potter won a Lifetime Achievement Award at the 2013 Kennedy Awards.

Potter was diagnosed with cancer in the early 2000s. He died from cancer on 8 May 2014, at the age of 72. He was survived by his wife, journalist Katrina Lee, and four children – Tim, Nick, Elisa and Jack.

Hamish McLean, the CEO of Ten Network Holdings (the parent company of Network Ten), called Potter "a giant of Australian journalism." According to Ten Eyewitness News presenter Sandra Sully, a "journalist of the year" award, named in honour of Potter, would continue to be awarded in his memory.

References

2014 deaths
10 News First presenters
Australian television journalists
Crime journalists
1941 births